The 2023 Bournemouth, Christchurch and Poole Council election will take place on 4 May, 2023, to elect all 76 members of Bournemouth, Christchurch and Poole Council in Dorset, England.

Councillors standing down

References 

 Notes

 Citations

2023 English local elections
2023
May 2023 events in the United Kingdom